Alfred Hunt (April 5, 1817 – March 27, 1888) was the first president of Bethlehem Iron Company, precursor of Bethlehem Steel.

Early life
Alfred Hunt was born of Quaker parentage, at Brownsville, Pennsylvania, the eldest child of Caleb Hunt (1786–1834) and his wife Rhoda Matthews (1789–1829), widow of Joseph  Bartlett (1781–1810). Alfred Hunt is a grandson of Joshua and Esther Hunt, who moved their young family from Moorestown, New Jersey to Brownsville, Pennsylvania in 1790.

Shortly after his father's death, Hunt and his six youngest siblings were brought by family members to Moorestown. Here they lived with Elisha Hunt, their father's brother, and his wife Mary (Hussey) Hunt on their  farm.

Professional life
Hunt's career in the iron and steel industry began in 1849 when the firm of Rowland and Hunt was formed for the purpose of operating The Cheltenham Rolling Mill, Cheltenham Township, Pennsylvania.

In 1850, Hunt and John C. Fremont formed a business relationship to mine gold on Fremont's property in California.

On July 15, 1860, Hunt was elected president by the board of directors of the fledgling Bethlehem Iron Company. He remained president until his death. The Bethlehem Iron Company eventually grew into Bethlehem Steel, which rose to become the second largest steel manufacturer in the United States prior to its 2001 bankruptcy.

{| class="toccolours" style="float: center; margin-left: 2em; margin-right: 1em; font-size: 100%; background:yellow; width:27em;" cellspacing="3"
| style="text-align: left;" | “Mr. Hunt was very much of a gentleman and knew how to meet any person from a king to a beggar.”
|-
| style="text-align: right;" | John Fritz
|}

Death
Alfred Hunt died in Moorestown and is interred in the family plot at Colestown Cemetery in Cherry Hill, New Jersey.

References and notes

Bibliography
 Davis (1877). "Bethlehem Iron Company". History of Northampton County, Pennsylvania. Philadelphia and Reading: Peter Fritts, Chapter XLV, pp. 212–213.
 Fremont, John C. (1850). Correspondence to Alfred Hunt. (Six letters which are in a private collection.)
 Hall, P. J. (1915). "History of South Bethlehem, Pa.". Semi-centennial, the borough of South Bethlehem, Pennsylvania, 1865-1915. Quinlan Printing Co.
 Hynes, Judy (1997). The descendants of John and Elizabeth (Woolman) Borton''. Mount Holly, New Jersey: John Woolman Memorial Association.

External links
Alfred Hunt's obituary
Hunt family history
Biographical information about Caleb and Elisha Hunt
Find A Grave Memorial for Alfred Hunt
Find A Grave Memorial for Rhoda (Matthews) Hunt
Find A Grave Memorial for Caleb Hunt

1817 births
1888 deaths
Quakers from Pennsylvania
American steel industry businesspeople
People from Brownsville, Pennsylvania
People from Moorestown, New Jersey
People from Montgomery County, Pennsylvania
People from Cheltenham, Pennsylvania
Burials at Colestown Cemetery (Cherry Hill, New Jersey)
19th-century American businesspeople
Bethlehem Steel people